Consuelo Adler Hernández (born in Caracas, Venezuela) is a Venezuelan model and beauty queen who became the second Miss International from her country in 1997.

Miss Venezuela
A year prior to her win as Miss International, she competed as Miss Miranda in her country's national beauty pageant, Miss Venezuela, obtaining the title of Miss Venezuela International and the Most Beautiful Skin and Photogenic awards.

She crowned the new Miss Venezuela International at the 1997 Miss Venezuela pageant the day before she flew to Japan to participate in the pageant that she actually won.

Miss International
The pageant was held in Kyoto Kaikan First Hall in Kyoto, Japan, where she was crowned Miss International 1997. Diya Abraham of India was first runner-up, and Marie Pauline Borg of France earned second runner-up. She also garnered the Miss Photogenic award.

Career
After beginning her modeling career in Paris where she did high fashion and major magazines. Currently as a model, her campaigns and TV commercials include: Sothys, Decleor, Cartier, Clairol, L'Oreal, Samuel Adam's, Johnson & Johnson, Wonderbra, Playtex, Nivea Ann Taylor, Vanity Fair and many others.

References

External links

People from Caracas
Living people
Miss International 1997 delegates
Miss International winners
Miss Venezuela International winners
Venezuelan expatriates in France
Venezuelan expatriates in the United States
Venezuelan female models
Venezuelan people of German descent
Venezuelan people of Irish descent
Year of birth missing (living people)
Venezuelan beauty pageant winners